The Church of the Great God (CGG) is one of the Armstrongist Churches of God. It broke away in 1992 from the Worldwide Church of God in the wake of the major shifts in its doctrine during the 1980s and 1990s. The CGG, headquartered in Fort Mill, South Carolina, continues to follow the teachings of Herbert W. Armstrong.

Formation
CGG was organized as a religious non-profit church in January 1992 in Charlotte, North Carolina, with the primary leadership core consisting of Pastor John Ritenbaugh; elders John Reid, Edwin Pope, and James Russell; and Martin Collins and Richard Ritenbaugh. It held its first service via telephone conference call between Charlotte and a small group in Laguna Niguel, California, on January 11, 1992. About 20 members attended. It grew to several hundred members scattered across the United States, with groups in Charlotte; Southern California; Chicago, Illinois; Washington, DC; Atlanta, Georgia; Big Sandy, Texas; Harrisburg, Pennsylvania; Portland, Oregon; Phoenix, Arizona; and several other locations.

Membership
CGG is small in membership, with about 400 persons attending services each week in about 50 small groups in the United States, Australia, Britain, Canada, France, the Philippines, South Africa, Trinidad, and Zambia. The church indicates it has "over 2,000 people" on their active postal mailing list, about 60,500 receiving its magazine, Forerunner, and over 106,500 subscribers to its daily email newsletter, The Berean: Daily Verse and Comment. An indeterminable number attend virtual Sabbath services at home each week by listening to the Fort Mill, South Carolina, congregation's services via live audio stream.

See also
 Armstrongism
 British Israelism
 Christian Sabbatarianism

References

External links
 Church of the Great God Official Website
 Online Bible and Biblical Resources run by Church of the Great God
 Sabbatarian Doctrine written by the CGG ministry

Church of God (Armstrong)
British Israelism
Groups claiming Israelite descent